Nikan High School is a boys-only school located in the north of Tehran, Iran. Nikan is an ancient Persian-Zoroastrian name meaning "all the goodness in the world".

The school is closely associated with Alavi High School.

Nikan graduates have strong ties and form communities in different parts of the world, especially in Europe and North America. Each class has a designated number called "doreh" which shows the number of years from the foundation of the school after which the class entered the first grade (primary school).

Admissions 
About 80% of the 8th grade class continues to 12th grade and admission past 8th grade is extremely rare.  The admission process consists of an entrance exam and an interview with the candidate and his parents. In the summer of 2011, around 250 students took Nikan's entrance exam for admission into 9th grade, from whom less than about 10% were chosen. Those students were then interviewed, along with their families, and about 10 students were eventually granted offers of admission.

Location 
The campus is located in the Elahiyeh neighborhood of Tehran.

External links 
 Nikan High School

See also
 Alborz High School
 Razi High School
 Zoroastrians in Iran

References

High schools in Iran
Schools in Tehran
Educational institutions established in 1967
Boys' schools in Iran